This List of fictional rodents in video games is subsidiary to the list of fictional animals and list of fictional rodents articles. This is a collection of various notable rodent characters that appear in various video games including beavers, chipmunks, gophers, guinea pigs, marmots, prairie dogs and porcupines.

Beavers

Hamsters

Mice

Rats

Squirrels

Other

See also
List of fictional rodents
List of fictional rodents in animation
List of fictional rodents in comics
List of fictional rodents in literature

References

Notes

 
 
 
 
 
Rodents